Yên Bái Air Base is a Vietnam People's Air Force (VPAF) (Không quân Nhân dân Việt Nam) military airfield located north-northwest of Yên Bái.

History

Vietnam War
On 15 November 1967 F-105s of the 357th Tactical Fighter Squadron bombed the base as part of a Commando Club guided bombing mission.

In February 1969 the 925th Fighter Regiment was formed at the base operating the MiG-17F and Shenyang J-6.

On 10 May 1972 a VPAF J-6 of the 925th Fighter Regiment ran out of fuel after a combat air patrol mission, deadsticked from an altitude of 1,400 meters, descending too rapidly, and overran the runway overturning and exploding, killing the pilot instantly.

On 1 June 1972 F-4D #65-0784 was shot down by a VPAF J-6 near the base, the weapons system operator Capt Roger Locher successfully evaded capture for 23 days before being rescued.

On 27 September 1972 USAF jets attacked the base, destroying one MiG-21 on the ground and damaging another.

On 30 September 1972 U.S. jets attacked the base destroying two MiG-17s on the ground.

In late 1972 USAF  F-111 Aardvark strike bombers attacked the base, rendering it temporarily inoperable, the only time Yên Bái was inoperable during Operation Linebacker II.

Current use
The VPAF 931st Fighter Squadron operating Su-22M-4/UM-3K is based at Yên Bái.

References

Installations of the Vietnam People's Air Force